The Hugo Municipal Pool, in Hugo, Colorado, was built during 1936–38.  It is located at the junction of US 287 and 6th Ave.  Its building was designed by Lloyd E. Heggenberger and built by the Works Progress Administration in what has come to be known as WPA Moderne style.  It was listed on the National Register of Historic Places in 2008.

Heggenberger also designed the Burlington Gymnasium, at 450 11th St. in Burlington, Colorado, which is also NRHP-listed.

References

External links 
More photos of the Hugo Municipal Pool at Wikimedia Commons

Park buildings and structures on the National Register of Historic Places in Colorado
Streamline Moderne architecture in the United States
WPA Moderne architecture
Buildings and structures completed in 1938
Buildings and structures in Lincoln County, Colorado
Works Progress Administration in Colorado
National Register of Historic Places in Lincoln County, Colorado
1938 establishments in Colorado